The Practical Shooting Association of the Czech Republic, Czech Asociace Praktické Střelby České Republiky (APSČR), is the Czech association for practical shooting under the International Practical Shooting Confederation.

See also 
IPSC Czech Handgun Championship
IPSC Czech Rifle Championship
IPSC Czech Shotgun Championship

External links 
 Official homepage of PSACR

References 

Regions of the International Practical Shooting Confederation
Practical Shooting
Sports organizations established in 1992